Walter Eugene Garrett (July 11, 1925 — October 17, 1993) was an American professional tennis player.

Raised in San Diego, Garrett was a collegiate tennis player for the UCLA Bruins and in 1950 won the NCAA doubles championship partnering Herbert Flam. His collegiate tennis career also include a singles win over Vic Seixas.

Garrett, who made third round of the French Open and Wimbledon in 1951, later competed as a professional. He defeated Bobby Riggs en route to winning the Eastern Professional Championships in 1955 and the following year played a quarter-final at the U.S. Pro Tennis Championships, which he lost to Pancho Segura.

In 1956 he was appointed to coach Syracuse University.

References

External links
 

1925 births
1993 deaths
American male tennis players
UCLA Bruins men's tennis players
Tennis players from San Diego
Syracuse Orange coaches